Yukarıköy can refer to:

 Yukarıköy, Ayvacık
 Yukarıköy, İnebolu